Numark may refer to:

Numark Industries: a company producing and selling DJ equipment
Numark (pharmacy): a chain of pharmacies in the United Kingdom
DJ Nu-Mark: DJ and member of hip hop crew Jurassic 5